Taza Pir Mosque (also Tazapir, Teze Pir, Teze-Pir, Tezepir) is a mosque in Baku, Azerbaijan. Its construction began in 1905 and was finished by 1914. The idea for the mosque as well as its financing was provided by an Azeri female philanthropist, Nabat Khanum Ashurbeyova (Ashurbeyli)

History
The history of the sanctuary dates back to the XIV and XV centuries. It existed first time as a tomb. The tomb belonged to Abu Seyid Abdulla who was a scholar and Islamic saint. The location of the sanctuary was known as “Xalfadam” until the middle of the last century. Over time, the tomb of Abu Seid Abdulla was exposed to destruction. However, the local population of Baku especially the Baku elites restored it several times. In 1817, son-in-law of Huseyngulu Khan, Qasim Bey financed restoration costs of the mosque. The actual construction of the temple began in the early 20th century. The construction of the mosque was started by construction foreman Karbalai Ahmed, and then completed under the direction of the architect Zivar bey Ahmadbay between 1905 and 1914 approximately 90 years later restoration of the tomb. The mosque was built on the tomb. The construction costs were met by Azerbaijani philanthropist Nabat Khanum Ashurbeyova. The construction of the Taza Pir Mosque took more than nine years due to financial and political issues of that time. Nabat Khanum, who financed several charitable projects simultaneously in Baku, could not afford to complete the mosque. In addition, due to breakout of Balkan War in 1911, Tsarist Russia had strictly controlled the activities of banks in Baku, assuming that Muslim millionaires could help the Ottoman Empire so that the Baku millionaires had to get the approval of officials from the Tsarist Department for the amount to be spent on the construction of Taza Pir Mosque.

Azerbaijani national industrial magnate and philanthropist Haji Zeynalabdin Taghiyev also actively attended in the construction process of the mosque.

Only 3 years after opening the mosque was closed in connection with the October Revolution in 1917. Over the years the mosque functioned as a cinema and a barn, and since 1943 to present day - as a mosque. Akhund of the mosque is the Grand Mufti of the Caucasus Allahshukur Pashazadeh.

Architecture
The Taza Pir Mosque was the first religious building that white stone was used in its construction in Baku city at that time. Architect Zivar bey Ahmedbayov designed the interior of the mosque in accordance with architectural examples of the Muslim East. The Taza Pir Mosque was considered a completely new stage, not only in the urban structure of Baku but also in the religious buildings of Absheron, due to architectural features. The facade of the Taza Pir Mosque is composed of porticos and minarets that rise from the flanks. According to the project, a square-shaped worship hall (19.6x19.6m) is complemented by huge domes. In interior decorations, local architectural elements were used. Taza Pir Mosque has a large-sized worship hall of. There are examples of calligraphy from holy book Koran written inside and outside of the mosque, as well as on the minarets. Between 2006 and 2009 the mosque underwent construction work and the old and detrited parts were restored. After restoration processes, the mosque provided with a ventilation system and its floor covered Namazgah carpet in which 720 people can worship at the same time. Interior of the mosque has an area of 1400 square meters and decorated with ornaments of painting schools of Azerbaijan plus with samples from eastern ornaments. The height of the dome and a half meters. The mihrab and dome of the mosque made of marble, while decorative elements of the mosque, the tops of minarets and labels are made of gold.

The dome, on which 6 times written La ilaha ilallah from Muslim proclamation of faith or Shahada, made from Qızılqaya (Gyzylgaya) stone.

References 

Mosques in Baku
Mosques completed in 1914
Zivar bey Ahmadbeyov buildings and structures